Sri Sri Aniruddhadeva Junior College is a Junior College located at Boiragimoth, Dibrugarh, Assam, India. It has been established in the year 1997. During the initial years up to 2011 it provided +2 level education only in the Science stream and hence named a Sri Sri Aniruddhadeva Junior Science College. It has introduced commerce stream from the 2012 session and the arts stream from the Academic Session 2013-14 and hence the college was renamed as Sri Sri Aniruddhadeva Junior College.

The college is named after Aniruddhadev, a Eksarana preceptor and social reformer of medieval Assam, who accomplished moral, ethical and religious upliftment of all, specially the backward and neglected sections of the society.

Campus 
The college is located at Boiragimoth, the heart of Dibrugarh. It is well connected by an all-weather road, just one-fourth kilometer away from NH-37.

Facilities 
The college has its own hostels. There are four separate hostel for boys and girls and the hostels are under the supervision of the college teachers

Library
The college Library has a seating capacity for about 60 readers at a time that caters to the needs of various books for the students.

References

External links 
Sri Sri Aniruddhadeva Junior College Official website

Universities and colleges in Assam
Dibrugarh
Educational institutions established in 1997
1997 establishments in Assam